Hot Rod is a 1979 American made-for-television drama film directed by George Armitage and starring Gregg Henry and Pernell Roberts.

Production
The film was made by ABC Circle, a division of ABC. Armitage says they just had a title, Hot Rod. In an interview with Nick Pinkerton, George Armitage stated, "And I went over there and talked to them, they said: 'Yeah, go ahead.' It was a street racer movie, that’s what I came up with, and we shot that in 15 days—TV was not generous with their time. We shot that up in Northern California, in Calistoga, wine country, and at the Fremont drag way."

Armitage says the story is based on the life of a friend of his, Bob Edelson, who was a top mechanic and with whom Armitage used to race.

Armitage used a number of actors who were under contract to ABC at the time.

References

External links

1979 television films
1979 films
1979 drama films
American auto racing films
ABC network original films
Films directed by George Armitage
American drama television films
1970s American films